Koundouros is a Greek surname. Notable people with the surname include:

Nikos Koundouros (1926–2017), Greek film director
Roussos A. Koundouros (1891–1944), Greek lawyer and politician

Greek-language surnames